Choi Jong-duk (born 24 June 1954) is a former South Korean footballer who played as a full-back. He is a gold medalist in the 1978 Asian Games.

Honours 
Korea University
Korean National Championship: 1974, 1976
Korean President's Cup runner-up: 1976

ROK Army
Korean Semi-professional League (Spring): 1980
Korean National Championship: 1979
Korean President's Cup runner-up: 1980

Sea Bee
Hong Kong FA Cup runner-up: 1981–82

Hallelujah FC
K League 1: 1983

Lucky-Goldstar Hwangso
K League 1: 1985

South Korea
Asian Games: 1978
 AFC Asian Cup runner-up: 1980

Individual
Korean National Championship Best Player: 1974
Korean FA Best XI: 1975, 1976, 1977, 1980
Korean FA Player of the Year: 1976

References

External links
Choi Jong-duk at KFA 

South Korean footballers
South Korea international footballers
1954 births
Living people
Pohang Steelers players
K League 1 players
FC Seoul players
Korea University alumni
Association football defenders
1980 AFC Asian Cup players
Asian Games gold medalists for South Korea
Asian Games medalists in football
Footballers at the 1978 Asian Games
Medalists at the 1978 Asian Games
Jong-duk